Prescot is a civil parish in Knowsley, Merseyside, England.  It contains 24 buildings that are recorded in the National Heritage List for England as designated listed buildings.   Of these, one is listed at  Grade I, the highest of the three grades, and the others are at Grade II, the lowest grade.  The parish contains the town of Prescot, which from the middle of the 18th century to the middle of the 19th century was of national importance as a centre of the watch-making industry.  This industry is reflected in some of the listed buildings that include workshops, some of which are detached and some are integrated into houses.  There is also a large former watch-making factory, and the town's museum (which is itself listed) contains a reconstructed watchmaker's workshop.  The other listed buildings include houses and associated structures, a public house, a former cinema, and two churches.

Key

Buildings

References

Citations

Sources

Listed buildings in Merseyside
Lists of listed buildings in Merseyside